The 1957 Minnesota Golden Gophers football team represented the University of Minnesota in the 1957 Big Ten Conference football season. In their fourth year under head coach Murray Warmath, the Golden Gophers compiled a 4–5 record and outscored their opponents by a combined total of 201 to 188.
 
Quarterback Dick Larson received the team's Most Valuable Player award. Fullback Dick Borstad, offensive lineman Perry Gehring and offensive lineman Mike Svendsen were named Academic All-Big Ten.

Total attendance at five home games was 314,769, an average of 62,953. The largest crowd was against Purdue.

Schedule

References

Minnesota
Minnesota Golden Gophers football seasons
Minnesota Golden Gophers football